Krishna Gopal Saxena (1912–2003) was an Indian homoeopathic physician. Born on 25 September 1912 in Delhi, he did his schooling at Karachi and Ambala and graduated in homoeopathic medicine from the Calcutta Homoeopathic Medical College.

Saxena was the first Honorary Advisor of the Homoeopathic Reference Committee, constituted by the Government of India in 1952 and served as the honorary physician to Dr. Rajendra Prasad, the first president of India. He held the chair of the Homoeopathic Advisory Committee of Government of Delhi from 1994 to 1999. A winner of N. C. Chakravarty Memorial National award and President of Honour award from the International Homoeopathy Congress, he was honoured by the Government of India in 1969, with the award of Padma Shri, the fourth highest Indian civilian award for his contributions to the society.

Saxena died in October 2003, survived by his wife, Sakuntala Devi.

See also

 Homoeopathy

References

Recipients of the Padma Shri in medicine
1912 births
2003 deaths
Medical doctors from Delhi
Indian homeopaths
20th-century Indian medical doctors